The Pallichelaru River is a river in Kerala, India. It begins at the southern cliffs of Kalaritharakunnu in Adoor and travels through Kunnathur and Karunagappally taluks of Kollam district in Kerala before merging with the Vattakkayal at Kannetti near Karunagapally.

Rivers of Pathanamthitta district